Catocala badia, the bay underwing, bayberry underwing or old maid,  is a moth of the family Erebidae. It is found from southern Maine and New Hampshire south to New York and Connecticut.

The wingspan is 50–60 mm. There is probably one generation per year. The badia subspecies is listed as a species of special concern in Connecticut.

The larvae feed on Comptonia peregrina, Myrica cerifera, Myrica gale, and Myrica pensylvanica.

References

Subspecies
Catocala badia badia
Catocala badia coelebs Grote, 1874 (Ontario and New Hampshire)

badia
Moths of North America
Moths described in 1866